The Lompoul desert (sometimes spelled Lumpoul; in French: désert de Lompoul) is a small desert (about 18 km2) located 145 km south of Saint-Louis, Senegal. It is characterized by orange sand dunes forming a landscape that is more akin to those of the Sahara and Mauritania than those of the surrounding area of Senegal (the Grande Côte), and is a popular tourist attraction of Senegal.

Festival du Sahel
Since 2009, a music festival named "Festival du Sahel" take place in the desert.

Footnotes

Geography of Senegal
Deserts of Senegal